Charles William Grant may refer to:

 Charles Grant (Australian politician) (1878–1943)
 Charles William Grant, 5th Baron de Longueuil (1782–1848)